Gerhard Dengler (29 May 1914 in Reinhausen – 3 January 2007 in Hennigsdorf) was an East German writer, print and broadcast journalist, and (briefly) newspaper editor.

Life

Early years
Gerhard Dengler's father was the noted Forestry Scientist Alfred Dengler (1874–1944).   He grew up in Eberswalde where his father was a professor and at one stage rector of the Forestry Academy.   Gerd studied Journalism in Berlin and then in Munich from 1934 till 1939.  Between 1935 and 1937 he undertook his military service in an Artillery Regiment in Frankfurt.   On 1 May 1937 he was admitted into the NSDAP (Nazi party).   He was also a member of the party's quasi-military wing, the Sturmabteilung (SA), having been in the youth branch of a precursor organisation, Der Stahlhelm since 1932.

War
In 1939 his studies led to a doctorate, which he received shortly before being recalled to the army. His unit fought against Poland and against France, where he was temporarily the Location commander for Autun. He was then sent to the Eastern front and took part in the Battle of Stalingrad as an Army Captain. He surrendered with his unit at the start of 1943 and became a member of the National Committee for a Free Germany, an alliance of exiled German soldiers who had become communist prisoners of war, now held in the Soviet Union. His switch from mainstream Naziism would prove heartfelt and enduring, and he paid a high personal price:  his father, on learning that Gerhard had become a Communist, took his own life in October 1944. Looking back in 1949, applying the then fashionable language of European Marxism, Gerhard Dengler spoke to a regional party congress of how he had "separated himself from his class". Many decades later, in a wide ranging and thought provoking radio interview broadcast in 2001, he explained how the outdated bourgeois preconceptions and the bourgeois social outlook with which he had grown up had been incinerated in the [cauldron of] Stalingrad.

German Democratic Republic
When Dengler returned to what was left of Germany he was flown back to the Soviet occupation zone which was undergoing a transformation into another one-party state to be called the German Democratic Republic (East Germany).   In 1946 he joined the newly created Socialist Unity Party (SED / Sozialistische Einheitspartei Deutschlands) and took a job in Dresden with the Sächsische Zeitung (newspaper). In 1948 he moved to Leipzig, an hour or so to the west of Dresden, and worked for a few weeks as the Editor in Chief of the Leipziger Volkszeitung. Between November 1948 and May 1949 he was editor in chief of "Der Augenzeuge" ("The eye-witness"), which was a weekly political newsreel presentation produced by the DEFA, the state-owned film company.   He then switched to the editorial team of Neues Deutschland, the mass-circulation national newspaper of the SED (party), working as the newspaper's first ever correspondent in the west German provisional capital, Bonn, between 1953 and 1958.

After returning to Berlin in 1958 Dengler became the chief commentator for Deutschlandsender, the country's national radio station, taking the position over from Karl-Eduard von Schnitzler. In 1959 he took on the vice-chairmanship of the National Presidium Council of the East German National Front, a political grouping of minor political parties and mass movements, each having a fixed quota of seats in the National Assembly (Volkskammer), and controlled through the National Front by the country's ruling SED (party).   In 1966 he became Vice-president of the National Front's National Council with responsibility for "West work", a position he held till 1969. From 1962 till 1967 he headed up the working group in the National Council on Braunbuch, a book that appeared in several editions and enjoyed large print-runs, and which detailed how numerous former Nazis continued to hold positions of power and influence in West Germany and in the West more generally.   (West Germany responded with a "Braunbuch" of its own detailing former Nazis who had turned up in positions of power and influence in East Germany.)

In September 1969 Dengler's career switched again, now to the (East) German "Walter Ulbricht" Academy for Legal and Political Science, where he headed up the "Foreign Information" section till he reached retirement in September 1979.

Die Wende
Gerhard Dengler lived long enough to see the changes that led to German reunification in 1990.   In extreme old age he gave a number of media interviews reflecting on some of the decisions he had made. He expressed no regrets over his decision to become a Communist.

"Of course we were Stalinists [in 1943].   Stalin, for us, was the hero who had defeated us in front of Moscow and in front of Stalingrad."

But he was open about the horror he felt when Khrushchev's secret speech delivered to the 20th Soviet Party Congress on 25 February 1956 became public.

"That was my second Stalingrad ... to learn that Stalin had murdered more Communists than Hitler."

He nevertheless remained confident that he had switched to the right side:

"In a farmhouse we were given tea, a piece of toast and some dried fish.   The Russians did not shoot me:  they shared their bread with me."

Until he died Gerhard Dengler remained active in the DRAFD (League of Germans in the Resistance, in the Armed Forces of the anti-Hitler coalition, and in the Free Germany movement / Deutscher in der Résistance, in den Streitkräften der Antihitlerkoalition).

Awards and honours
1961 Patriotic Order of Merit in Bronze
1964 Patriotic Order of Merit in Silver
1989 Star of People's Friendship

Publications
Zwei Leben in einem, Berlin, Militärverlag der DDR, 1989
Viele Beulen im Helm. Mein Leben als SED-Funktionär, Books-on-demand, 2000

References

German male journalists
German Army personnel of World War II
Sturmabteilung personnel
Socialist Unity Party of Germany members
Recipients of the Patriotic Order of Merit
1914 births
2007 deaths
German male writers
20th-century German journalists
Leipziger Volkszeitung editors